Flagstaff, New Zealand may refer to:

Flagstaff (Otago), a hill overlooking the city of Dunedin
Flagstaff, Hamilton, a suburb of Hamilton

See also
 Flagstaff Hill (New Zealand) in the Bay of Islands